Topelius is a surname. Notable people with this surname include:

Toini Topelius (1854–1910), Finnish journalist and writer
Zachris Topelius (1818–1898), Swedish-speaking Finnish author, poet, journalist, historian, and rector

See also
Toppelius